Aleksandr Kerchenko (born 23 April 1946) is a Soviet speed skater. He competed in the men's 1500 metres event at the 1968 Winter Olympics.

References

1946 births
Living people
Soviet male speed skaters
Olympic speed skaters of the Soviet Union
Speed skaters at the 1968 Winter Olympics
Sportspeople from Omsk